Miry Brook is an unincorporated area in the City of Danbury in  Fairfield County, Connecticut. It is located in the western part of the city, bordering Mill Plain to the north and west at Lake Kenosia and the town of Ridgefield, Connecticut, to the southwest. The Danbury Airport is located in Miry Brook.

History
The name Miry Brook is derived from the presence of swampland or “mire,” which makes up the landscape of the area, as well as the aptly named stream or “brook” that runs through it. According to local tradition however, it was named after an incident that occurred during the 1777 British retreat from Danbury (see Battle of Ridgefield), in which the Americans destroyed the bridge at Wolf Pond Run to impede the British, causing them a delay and mired artillery. Although this story may be true, it is not what gave rise to the name of the waterway and area, as there are recorded mentions of Miry Brook from as early as 1712.

Miry Brook School
Although almost unrecognizable today, the Miry Brook Schoolhouse is one of four original district schools remaining in Danbury. In the early 1900s it was considered a "model rural school," and was part of a training program, where Danbury Normal School (now WestConn) students completed their student teaching labs. It would later become the auxiliary police headquarters & Civil Defense Building, and has since undergone major modifications.

Watershed
As its name suggests, Miry Brook consists of a primary waterway surrounded by swampy wetlands. The Miry Brook itself begins in Ridgefield and runs throughout Danbury until it reaches the Still River and feeds into it as one of its major tributaries. This connects Miry Brook to the Housatonic River and Long Island Sound.

Parks and recreation
Danbury Dog Park

References

Neighborhoods in Connecticut
Populated places in Fairfield County, Connecticut
Danbury, Connecticut
Geography of Danbury, Connecticut